Brent McConnell (born 12 November 1980) is an Australian former professional rugby league footballer. He made his NRL debut for the North Queensland Cowboys against the South Sydney Rabbitohs in Round 17, 2006. In that match McConnell scored the match-winning try against Souths to win the game for North Queensland 16–14 with only five minutes left. He only played two more games in 2006 due to injury.

For the 2007 season, McConnell moved to the Brisbane Broncos, playing most of the season in the Queensland Cup for the Aspley Broncos. He then joined the Burleigh Bears.

References

1980 births
Living people
Australian rugby league players
Burleigh Bears players
North Queensland Cowboys players
Rugby league halfbacks
Rugby league players from Penrith, New South Wales